Lamar S. Owens Jr. (born September 6, 1983) is an American football coach and former midshipman and starting quarterback at the United States Naval Academy. He has coached at Georgia Tech and Georgia Southern.

Owens grew up in Savannah, Georgia, and attended Benedictine Military School.

In 2006, Owens, a 22-year-old senior, was charged under the Uniform Code of Military Justice (UCMJ) with raping a female midshipman. A court-martial panel found him not guilty of rape but guilty of conduct unbecoming an officer and violating a direct order.

Rape trial
At trial, presiding military judge Commander John A. Maksym determined that the superintendent of the Naval Academy, Vice-Admiral Rodney P. Rempt had made comments and sent emails that constituted an appearance of unlawful command influence and granted the defense additional peremptory challenges during jury selection.

The court martial convicted Owens of two violations of the UCMJ, but sentenced him to "no punishment". He was not allowed to graduate, a decision that stirred some controversy.

On January 19, 2007, Vice Admiral Paul E. Sullivan affirmed the jury's decision to clear Owens of raping a female midshipman and impose no punishment for convictions of conduct unbecoming an officer and violating a military protective order.

Navy Secretary Donald C. Winter ruled his conduct "unsatisfactory" and ordered him discharged. On April 12, 2007, Owens was expelled. His education was valued at close to $136,000, but his debt was reduced to approximately $91,000 "in recognition of his noteworthy professional conduct", the Navy stated in a written statement.

Supporters launched an effort on his behalf including, letter-writing and lobbying in Annapolis and Washington.

Coaching career
In 2010, Owens became an assistant coach at Georgia Tech under head coach Paul Johnson. During his time at Georgia Tech, Owens served as the Community Service Director for the football team. In 2009 and 2010, Owens hosted summer camps in his hometown of Savannah.  For the past three years he has hosted a one-day summer camp, named Fundamentals on the Field on Georgia Tech’s campus in partnership with the Chick-fil-A Foundation and Fellowship of Christian Athletes.

Owens also earned a Lean Six Sigma Black Belt from Scheller School of Business at Georgia Tech in August 2014. He has applied six sigma methodologies in every aspect of his coaching duties.

On February 19, 2016, Owens began attending the NCAA and NFL Coaches Academy in Tampa, FL.

In 2019, Owens became the wide receivers coach at Georgia Southern. In December, Owens resigned his post as wide receivers coach at Georgia Southern.

References

External links

 Georgia Tech profile

1983 births
Living people
Georgia Southern Eagles football coaches
Georgia Tech Yellow Jackets football coaches
Navy Midshipmen football players
People acquitted of rape
Coaches of American football from Georgia (U.S. state)
Players of American football from Savannah, Georgia
African-American coaches of American football
African-American players of American football
21st-century African-American sportspeople
20th-century African-American people